Kiril Lozanov Ivkov (born 21 June 1946) is a former Bulgarian footballer who played as a defender, most notably for Levski Sofia. In 1974 and 1975 he was named Bulgarian Footballer of the Year.

Ivkov made his Bulgaria debut in 1968, earning 44 caps and scoring one goal over an eleven-year international career. He was part of the squad for the 1968 Summer Olympics, where Bulgaria won the silver medal. Ivkov captained his country 10 times and played in the 1974 FIFA World Cup.

Club career
Born in Pernik, Ivkov began his career at local club Metalurg. In 1966, he left to join top league side Minyor Pernik. After one season at Minyor, Ivkov joined Levski Sofia where he won four Bulgarian League titles and four Bulgarian Cups. He spent eleven years at Levski, scoring 15 goals in 375 appearances in all competitions.

Honours

Player
Levski Sofia
 Bulgarian League (4): 1967–68, 1969–70, 1973–74, 1976–77
 Bulgarian Cup (4): 1969–70, 1970–71, 1975–76, 1976–77  

Bulgaria
 Silver Medal at the Summer Olympic Games: 1968

Individual
 Bulgarian Footballer of the Year (2): 1974, 1975

Manager
Levski Sofia
 Bulgarian Cup: 1985–86

References

External links
Player Profile at LevskiSofia.info

1946 births
Living people
Bulgarian footballers
Bulgaria international footballers
Association football defenders
F.C. Metalurg Pernik players
PFC Minyor Pernik players
PFC Levski Sofia players
First Professional Football League (Bulgaria) players
1974 FIFA World Cup players
Footballers at the 1968 Summer Olympics
Olympic footballers of Bulgaria
Olympic silver medalists for Bulgaria
Olympic medalists in football
Medalists at the 1968 Summer Olympics
Bulgarian football managers
PFC Levski Sofia managers
People from Pernik